Pole to Pole with Michael Palin is an eight-part television documentary travel series made for the BBC, and first broadcast on BBC1 in 1992. The presenter is Michael Palin, this being the second of Palin's major journeys for the BBC. The first was Around the World in 80 Days with Michael Palin, a 7-part series first broadcast on BBC One in 1989, and the third was Full Circle with Michael Palin, a 10-part series first broadcast on BBC One in 1997.

The trip from the North Pole to the South Pole went via Scandinavia, the Soviet Union, parts of Europe, and through the heart of Africa. The intention was to follow the 30-degree east line of longitude, which would cover the most land. A last-minute diversion to Chile included South America in the series. Using aircraft as little as possible, the whole trip lasted 5½ months.

The programme has been sold to many television stations around the world. It was also released on video tape and later on DVD. Following the trip, Palin wrote Pole to Pole describing the trip. The book contains many pictures from the trip, almost all taken by Basil Pao, the stills photographer on the team.

Episode list

The journey

Cold Start
Palin begins at the North Pole, flying there on a small aeroplane fitted with skis. The North Pole scene was filmed in May 1992, after the rest of the series had been shot, as weather conditions were more suitable then as the ice was too fragile the previous year. From there, he heads to Greenland, then the Norwegian island of Spitsbergen, where the towns of Ny-Ålesund and Longyearbyen are located. From there he sails across the Barents Sea on a supply ship to the Norwegian port city of Tromsø, where he visits a statue of Roald Amundsen, the first man to reach the South Pole. He also meets some avid Norwegian football fans. In the town of Karasjok, he meets up with the Sami people and pans for gold in the Karasjoka River.  From there, Palin travels by bus and crosses the border from Norway to Finland, where he visits Santa Claus at the Santa Claus Village on the Arctic Circle near Rovaniemi. He takes an overnight Finnish train to Helsinki; he relaxes in a sauna near Helsinki with Neil Hardwick and Lasse Lehtinen. Then Palin catches a ferry to Tallinn, his first stop in the Soviet Union. He visits Estonians who sing a song, dreaming of the day when Estonia would again be an independent country. Then Palin catches a train headed for Leningrad.

Russian Steps
In Leningrad, Palin meets up with a Vladimir Lenin impersonator, who gives him a tour of the city. He witnesses a Russian Orthodox baptism ceremony, and almost gets baptised himself. He visits the cemetery where the likes of Mussorgsky, Tchaikovsky, and Fyodor Dostoyevsky are buried, then has the honour of firing the midday gun at the Peter and Paul Fortress. After buying some pears at a local market he experiences the difficulty of trying to buy a bottle of vodka in a supermarket which is "uncontaminated by food", a reference to Monty Python's Cheese Shop sketch. In Novgorod, he meets a director who casts him in a film. Then he is invited to a dinner party, eating freshly caught crayfish and drinking 23 toasts with homemade vodka. After participating in a ceremony on behalf of the sister city of Watford (portrayed as a dream) he visits the town of Chernobyl, Ukraine, scene of the 1986 nuclear disaster. He then travels to Kyiv and Odessa, where he is wrapped in sulphurous, black mud. At the harbour in Odessa he descends the stairs shown in the film Battleship Potemkin, then boards a ferry and sails across the Black Sea. While on the ferry, Palin learns of the coup that attempted to overthrow Mikhail Gorbachev, which leads to the collapse of the Soviet Union a few months later.

Mediterranean Maze
Arriving by ferry to Istanbul, Turkey, Palin stays at the Pera Palas, where Agatha Christie wrote Murder on the Orient Express and experiences a turkish bath, getting the full treatment from a large, mostly silent staff member. He checks out a local bazaar, as well as a procession at Topkapi Palace. He then takes a train through western Turkey to Marmaris and catches ferries to first Rhodes, Greece then to Cyprus. Palin then visits the British military base at Akrotiri and attends a huge Cypriot wedding. From Limassol, Palin heads for North Africa, his home for the next few months. His first stop is Port Said, Egypt, where the filming crew temporarily loses a tripod and has delays with Customs there. Then he crosses paths with his location in Around the World in 80 Days in Cairo, from where he takes a train to Luxor. Catching a boat up the Nile River, he checks out ancient Egyptian ruins with tourists from Sheffield. From Aswan, he catches a ferry bound for Wadi Halfa and braces himself for what appears to be a rough road ahead.

Shifting Sands
Arriving in Wadi Halfa, Sudan, Palin boards a train bound for Khartoum, the capital. There he learns that he will be unable to journey further south into Sudan due to the ongoing conflict in the southern region of the nation. Seeking an alternative, he finds Eritreans willing to drive him to the border with Ethiopia. While waiting to leave Khartoum he inspects some camels in nearby Omdurman and a Muslim Sufi ceremony where people dance to attain religious ecstasy. When it comes time to leave Khartoum, the journey to the town of Gedaref near the Ethiopian border is hampered by poor road conditions, and the vehicles are repeatedly stuck in the ruts left in the dirt from large trucks that travelled the road in the rainy season, forcing Palin and the other passengers to push them free. Compounding the difficulty, in Ethiopia a long civil war has just ended, resulting in the overthrow of the Derg regime. There was the added risk of rebels from the war hiding near the border. Finally, after spending 24 hours travelling the distance from London to Oxford, 95.56 km (59.4 mi), he arrives at the Ethiopian border.

Crossing the Line
In the old Ethiopian capital of Gondar, Palin visits the former home of Emperor Haile Selassie, as well as his pet lion. From there he visits Lake Tana where he learns that one of his guides in Kenya has fallen ill. Then he travels to the current capital of Addis Ababa, where he sees communist symbols being destroyed. He also witnesses a peaceful demonstration turn violent. After a couple of hitchhiking rides he arrives at the Kenya border. He then journeys to Lerata and the school where part of the movie The Missionary was filmed. As a gift he gives the school the inflatable globe he used in Around the World in 80 Days. In Nairobi he prepares himself for a safari.

Plains and Boats and Trains
In Kenya Palin takes a hot-air balloon ride. On the ground in the Maasai Mara he observes a lioness and her cubs up close. In Tanzania, he fulfils a lifelong dream by visiting the Ngorongoro Crater. In Dodoma he catches a train bound for the town of Kigoma. In the nearby town of Ujiji he visits the site where David Livingstone and Henry Stanley had their famous meeting. Palin then catches what is believed to be the world's oldest operating ferry: the MV Liemba down Lake Tanganyika to Mpulungu in Zambia.

Evil Shadow
In Zambia Palin meets a witch doctor who tells him that he has an "evil shadow" and bad things lie ahead for him. He then is given a piece of tree bark to "wash" with, supposedly a medicinal aid. Palin journeys down through Zambia, where long-time leader Kenneth Kaunda has just been ousted. He visits the Shiwa Ngandu estate, run by Lorna Harvey (daughter of original owner Sir Stewart Gore-Browne) and her husband John. The Harveys were murdered six months after Palin's visit.

Palin then moves on to Victoria Falls on the Zambezi River, where he goes whitewater rafting. He also tries swimming through some rapids wearing a life jacket, resulting in a cracked rib. One of his suitcases has been lost by the local railway company, and a crew member catches malaria. Palin then decides to take the medicine administered by the witch doctor.

Entering Zimbabwe he visits the tomb of Cecil Rhodes, for whom the country was originally named Rhodesia. Moving on to Bulawayo he meets up with another BBC—the Bulawayo Bowlers Club, and visits a local nightclub. Then he heads towards his last African frontier, between Zimbabwe and South Africa, where apartheid was abolished four months earlier.

While in South Africa Palin attends a local football match. In Johannesburg he learns that the S. A. Agulhas, a scientific research ship they were scheduled to take to Antarctica, has no space for them. While the BBC scrambles for alternatives, Palin visits Western Deep Levels Mine, the world's deepest gold mine. In Soweto he meets former South African neighbours of his from London; jazz trombonist Jonas Gwangwa and family. Then he catches the luxurious Blue Train to Cape Town. On top of Table Mountain he regards the southern tip of Africa and reminisces about how the continent changed him from an optimist to a realist. The BBC's efforts to get him on the Agulhas have failed, and it appears that he will be unable to reach the South Pole.

Bitter End
Although he is unable to reach Antarctica via the Agulhas, a travel adventure company is able to take Palin to the South Pole from their base in Chile. This means Palin must abandon the 30 degrees east meridian. Travelling by aeroplane from Cape Town to Santiago via Rio de Janeiro, he listens to an unusual rendition of "Happy Birthday to You" at the Presidential Palace where the 1973 coup took place. After having lunch at a fish market with his guide while listening to a panflute player, he is off to Punta Arenas in southern Chile.

From there he waits anxiously for the weather conditions to allow the trip to Antarctica. After a couple of days, Palin and the others-including motorcyclist Shinji Kazama-fly on a 1953-built Douglas DC-6 plane to a base camp at Patriot Hills. While there, he met with mountaineer and Sir Edmund Hillary’s son Peter Hillary while waiting again for the go-ahead to set off for the South Pole. Finally, after a day, he makes a final flight to the Amundsen–Scott South Pole Station and then, at 02:00 New Zealand time on 4 December 1991, Palin sets foot on the South Pole, one of a small number of people who have visited both the North and South Poles.

References

External links
 Palin's Travels – the official website

1992 British television series debuts
1992 British television series endings
1990s British documentary television series
1990s British travel television series
BBC television documentaries
Documentary films about Antarctica
BBC travel television series
English-language television shows
Works by Michael Palin